Callistocypraea broderipii is a species of sea snail, a cowry, a marine gastropod mollusk in the family Cypraeidae, the cowries.

Description
Callistocypraea broderipii are typically between 60mm and 90mm in length.

Distribution
This species occurs in the Indian Ocean along Madagascar and Mauritius.

References

 Lorenz, F. (2017). Cowries. A guide to the gastropod family Cypraeidae. Volume 1, Biology and systematics. Harxheim: ConchBooks. 644 pp

External links

Cypraeidae
Gastropods described in 1832
Taxa named by John Edward Gray